Platform 0 is an exhibition project of the Madrid Metro consisting of the historical Estación de Chamberí, which has been out of service since 1966, and the Motores de Pacífico generator building. Visitors can view the restored 1919 station with its original ceramic billboards and antique furniture, as well as displays about the history of the Madrid Metro.

References 

Madrid Metro
Museums in Madrid
Transport museums in Spain
History museums in Spain
Technology museums in Spain